The Little River is a  river in Louisa and Hanover counties in the U.S. state of Virginia. It is a tributary of the North Anna River, and via the North Anna, Pamunkey, and York rivers is part of the Chesapeake Bay watershed.

See also
List of rivers of Virginia

References

USGS Hydrologic Unit Map - State of Virginia (1974)

Rivers of Virginia
Tributaries of the York River (Virginia)
Rivers of Louisa County, Virginia
Rivers of Hanover County, Virginia